John Wimpole or Wynpol, of Canterbury, Kent, was an English politician.

Family
Wimpole married, before January 1378, a woman named Sarah.

Career
Wimpole was a Member of Parliament for the Canterbury constituency in September 1388.

References

Year of birth missing
Year of death missing
People from Canterbury
14th-century births
English MPs September 1388